Nanhua Temple is a Buddhist monastery of the Chan Buddhism, one of Five Great Schools of Buddhism where Huineng, the Sixth Patriarch of Chan Buddhism, once lived and taught. The location is in the northern part of the province, within a few kilometers from the Bei River.

History 
The temple was founded during the time of the Northern and Southern Dynasties in 502 AD by an Indian monk named Zhiyao Sanzang who originally named the site Baolin Temple. It received its present name in 968 during the reign of the Song dynasty Emperor Taizong. Ancestor Hanshan Deqing taught there and reformed the monastery in the 16th century.  The site was later renovated in 1934 under the leadership of Hsu Yun whose body is housed in the central forest sanctuary. Recent changes to the site include the building of extensive monastic accommodations.

Architecture
It consists of a set of magnificent Buddhist buildings, including the Hall of Four Heavenly Kings, Mahavira Hall, Sutra Depository, Sixth Ancestor Hall, Lingzhao Pagoda and 690 Buddhist statues.

There are 9 Chinese swamp cypresses (Glyptostrobus pensilis) believed to be 400 to 500 years old in the temple.

Caoxi Gate
Inside the Caoxi Gate, a plaque with the Chinese characters "Nanhua Chan Temple" hanging on the door lintel written by the former President of Chinese Buddhist Association, the late Upasaka Zhao Puchu.

Hall of Heavenly Kings
The majestic Hall of Heavenly Kings was originally built in 1474 during the Ming dynasty (1368–1644) and rebuilt during the Qing dynasty (1644–1911). The statue of Maitreya Bodhisattva is enshrined in the hall and the mighty statues of the four Heavenly Kings holding religious objects stand on both sides of the statue of Maitreya. Behind the hall is a three-storey bell tower which was constructed in 1301 during the Yuan Dynasty (1271–1368). On top of the bell tower there hangs a brass bell from the Southern Song Dynasty (1127–1279).

Mahavira Hall
The Mahavira Hall, constructed during the Yuan dynasty (1271–1368), stands in the center of the temple. Covered by glazed tiles, it houses the Buddha statues of Sakyamuni Buddha, Medicine Buddha, and Amitabha, which are situated in the sacrarium of the hall. Within the Grand Hall there are about 500 fine clay sculptures of Buddhist arhats.

The temple holds many precious cultural relics; the most precious being the statue of Hui Neng, which is worshiped in the Sixth Ancestor Hall and the body of Han Shan.  There are 360 Buddhist arhat figures which are the only Chinese wooden carvings preserved from the Northern Song Dynasty (960–1127) and a rare cassock trimmed with the dainty embroidery of over 1,000 Buddhist figures.

Early impressions by Jesuits 
The first account of Nanhua Temple for the European audience was most likely provided by Matteo Ricci, who visited it in August or September 1589, when relocating from Zhaoqing to Shaoguan. The Jesuit was impressed by the temple, "magnificent in grandeur", and its fountain, "graciously designed and wonderfully built", as well as by the beautiful surroundings, but viewed the "idol-worshipping emissaries of the Satan" (i.e., the Buddhist clergy) with disdain and prejudice. He saw the relics of the Sixth Patriarch (Lusu, i.e. , Liu Zu, in Ricci's account) as well. The local authorities had suggested to the missionaries (Ricci and his younger colleague, Antonio Almeida) that they can find a place to live on the temple compound, but they strongly preferred to live in the city instead, closer to the region's ruling elites.

References

Bibliography

External links

 

Towers completed in the 14th century
14th-century Buddhist temples
Buddhist temples in Shaoguan
Chan temples
Buildings and structures in Shaoguan
Tourist attractions in Shaoguan
Major National Historical and Cultural Sites in Guangdong
Religious buildings and structures completed in 1301
Religious buildings and structures completed in 1474